South American Association of Master Athletes (or ASUDAMA) is a regional body of World Masters Athletics, responsible for organizing masters athletics championship competitions for athletes from the continent of South America. All athletes 35 years of age or older are eligible to compete. The biennial Championships are held in alternate years with the WMA Outdoor Championships.

History

References

External links

Athletics organizations
Masters athletics (track and field)
Masters athletics (track and field) competitions
Biennial athletics competitions